Leonard Beck Jordan (May 15, 1899June 30, 1983) was an American politician who served as the 23rd governor of Idaho and a United States Senator for over ten years.

Early life and education
Born in Mount Pleasant, Utah, Jordan's father was a county judge and his mother was a schoolteacher; the family relocated to northeast Oregon and he was educated in the public schools of Enterprise, the seat of Wallowa County.

From a large family, Jordan worked on a ranch then enlisted in the U.S. Army at age 18 in 1917. After two years in the service, he attended the University of Oregon in Eugene on a football scholarship, and was a  halfback for the Webfoots. Jordan graduated in 1923, and was awarded a key to Phi Beta Kappa. He married classmate Grace Edington on December 30, 1924.

Career
Jordan was commissioned as a second lieutenant in the U.S. Army during World War I, but did not serve overseas. After college, he was a sheep rancher in Hells Canyon in Idaho during the Great Depression at Kirkwood Bar, and then settled in Grangeville in 1940, where he established a farm implement business, a real estate agency, and an automobile dealership.

Jordan was elected to the Idaho Senate in 1946 but lost his seat in 1948.

Governor (1951–1955)
Jordan successfully ran for governor in 1950.

During his four-year term, slot machines were banned; employment, unemployment, and job training services were merged; and the state highway commission was initiated. Jordan did not run for re-election in 1954 because it was not allowed at the time. Starting with the 1946 election, Idaho changed from two-year to four-year terms for governor, but disallowed self-succession (re-election). Jordan's successor as governor was the former attorney general, Robert Smylie, who successfully lobbied the 1955 legislature to propose an amendment to the state constitution to allow gubernatorial re-election, which was approved by voters in the 1956 general election. (Smylie was re-elected in 1958 and 1962, and sought a fourth term in 1966, but was defeated in the primary.)

In 1955, Jordan was appointed by President Eisenhower as Chairman of the United States section of the International Joint Commission with Canada.

U.S. Senate career

Appointment and special election of 1962
In August 1962, Jordan was appointed to the U.S. Senate by Governor Smylie, following the death of Henry Dworshak in July. In November, Jordan defeated Democratic congresswoman Gracie Pfost of Nampa in the special election to complete the remaining four years of the term.

Election of 1966
Jordan was elected to a full term in 1966, defeating former Democratic congressman Ralph R. Harding of Blackfoot.

Legislative record
In the Senate, Jordan helped Frank Church establish the Sawtooth National Recreation Area in 1972, and voted in favor of the Civil Rights Acts of 1964 and 1968, as well as the Voting Rights Act of 1965 and the confirmation of Thurgood Marshall to the U.S. Supreme Court. He also voted in favor of the Equal Rights Amendment.

In August 1971, Jordan announced that he would not seek re-election in 1972, and was succeeded by Jim McClure, the three-term Republican congressman from the first district. At age 73, Jordan was the first from Idaho to voluntarily retire from the U.S. Senate.

Election results

Source:^ Jordan was appointed to the vacant seat in August 1962

Legacy and death
A state office building in Boise, near the state capitol, was named for him in December 1973. Jordan died at age 84 in Boise on June 30, 1983, and his wife died two years later. They are interred at Cloverdale Memorial Park in west Boise.

Daughter Patricia (1927–2010) married Charles F. Story, Jr. (1926–2014) of Spokane in 1951; 
 and they later lived in Boise. Eldest son Joseph (1929–2015) graduated from the U.S. Military Academy (West Point) in 1952 and served three years in the U.S. Army. He went to graduate school in civil engineering at Iowa State University in Ames and was a district vice president with Morrison-Knudsen in Alaska. Youngest son Stephen (1932–2015) graduated from the University of Idaho in Moscow in 1955 in mechanical engineering, and worked for General Electric.

References

External links

Jordan's Congressional papers, 1962–1972 are housed at Albertsons Library, Boise State University
Len Jordan Digital Collection  features photographs of his career as Governor of Idaho from 1950 to 1954 and United States Senator from 1962 to 1973
National Governors Association
You Tube video - Kirkwood Bar in Hells Canyon

1899 births
1983 deaths
Republican Party governors of Idaho
People from Mount Pleasant, Utah
Republican Party United States senators from Idaho
University of Oregon alumni
People from Grangeville, Idaho
Ranchers from Idaho
20th-century American politicians
American United Methodists
20th-century Methodists